John Welch (October 28, 1805 – August 5, 1891) was an American lawyer, jurist, and politician who served one term as a U.S. Representative from Ohio from 1851 to 1853.

Biography
Born near New Athens, Ohio, Welch received a liberal schooling and graduated from Franklin College.
He moved to Athens County in 1828 and settled in Rome Township.
He engaged in the milling business.
He studied law.
He was admitted to the bar and commenced practice in Athens, Ohio, in 1833.
He served as prosecuting attorney of Athens County 1841-1843.
He served as member of the Ohio Senate 1845-1847.

Welch was elected as a Whig to the Thirty-second Congress (March 4, 1851 – March 3, 1853).
He declined to be a candidate for renomination in 1852.
He served as delegate to the Whig National Convention in 1852.
He resumed the practice of law.
Presidential elector for Republicans Fremont/Dayton in 1856
He served as judge of the court of common pleas 1862-1865.
He served as associate justice of the supreme court of Ohio 1865-1878 and was chief justice in 1877 and 1878.
He died in Athens, Ohio, August 5, 1891.
He was interred in West Union Street Cemetery.

Welch was married in 1829 to Martha Starr, who had two sons.

Publications

Notes

Sources

External links

1805 births
1891 deaths
Justices of the Ohio Supreme Court
Ohio University trustees
People from Harrison County, Ohio
People from Athens County, Ohio
Ohio lawyers
Ohio state senators
Franklin College (New Athens, Ohio)
1856 United States presidential electors
Ohio Republicans
County district attorneys in Ohio
Whig Party members of the United States House of Representatives from Ohio
19th-century American politicians
19th-century American judges
19th-century American lawyers